Harvey "Gink" Hendrick (November 9, 1897 – October 29, 1941) was an American Major League Baseball player who played for several different teams during an eleven-year career.

Early years
Born near Mason, Tennessee on November 9, 1897 to Richard T. and Nannie Harvey Hendrick, Hendrick went to elementary school in Brownsville, Tennessee. Hendrick attended preparatory school at Fitzgerald & Clarke School in Tullahoma, Tennessee; also attended by the likes of Vanderbilt football greats Lynn Bomar and Hek Wakefield. He then attended Vanderbilt University, playing football and baseball for the Commodores. He was a favored target of Jess Neely on the football team.

Professional baseball
He signed with the Memphis Chicks after graduating from Vanderbilt, but was released from the team before playing a game. He began his professional career with the Chattanooga Lookouts in 1921, and had a .274 batting average in 141 games. He followed that up the following year with a .311 batting average in 134 games for the Galveston Sand Crabs. During the offseason, shortly after being signed by the Boston Red Sox, Hendrick was traded to the New York Yankees with George Pipgras for Al DeVormer. He made his major league debut with the Yankees in 1923, where he had a .273 batting average in 37 games and had one at-bat in the 1923 World Series.

After one more year with New York where he played in 40 games, he joined the Cleveland Indians and played in 25 games for them. Hendrick spent 1926 in the minor leagues with the Newark Bears, then joined the Brooklyn Robins, arriving days before everyone else for spring training, as the team planned to use him as a utility player. In 1927, he had a .310 average and 29 stolen bases in 128 games, then followed that up a .318 average in 1928, a .354 average in 1929 which was ninth in the National League along with 14 home runs and 82 runs batted in, and a .257 average in 1930. After playing in one game for the Robins in 1931, he was traded to the Cincinnati Reds for Mickey Heath.

In 137 games for the Reds, he had a .314 batting average. Hendrick split 1932 with the Reds and St. Louis Cardinals, who he was traded to during the season for Chick Hafey. He then finished his career with the Chicago Cubs in 1933 and the Philadelphia Phillies in 1934.

In an 11-year major league career, Hendrick batted .308 (896-2910) with 434 runs scored, 48 home runs and 413 RBIs in 922 games played. His on-base percentage was .364 and slugging percentage was .443. He surpassed the .300 mark four times.

Death
Hendrick died by his own hand, shooting himself in his Covington, Tennessee home, on October 29, 1941. He was 43.

See also
List of Vanderbilt University people
1920 Vanderbilt Commodores football team
1920 College Football All-Southern Team

References

External links

Harvey Hendrick at Baseball Almanac

1897 births
1941 suicides
Baseball players from Tennessee
Major League Baseball first basemen
New York Yankees players
Cleveland Indians players
Brooklyn Robins players
Cincinnati Reds players
St. Louis Cardinals players
Chicago Cubs players
Philadelphia Phillies players
Vanderbilt University alumni
Suicides by firearm in Tennessee
Chattanooga Lookouts players
Galveston Sand Crabs players
Newark Bears (IL) players
Providence Grays (minor league) players
New Orleans Pelicans (baseball) players
People from Tipton County, Tennessee
Vanderbilt Commodores baseball players
Vanderbilt Commodores football players
All-Southern college football players